The spotted codlet, MacClelland's unicorn-cod, or unicorn cod, Bregmaceros mcclellandi, is a small, deepwater codlet fish found in the western Indian Ocean to eastern Thailand. This species is of commercial importance to local fisheries.

References

Bregmacerotidae
Fish described in 1840